United States v. Jones may refer to several Supreme Court cases:

United States v. Jones (1883), 109 U.S. 513 (1883), a case in which the Court outlined the requirements of the United States government when instituting the right of eminent domain
United States v. Jones (1886), 119 U.S. 477 (1886)
United States v. Jones (1887), 121 U.S. 89 (1887)
United States v. Jones (1889), 131 U.S. 1 (1889)
United States v. Jones (1890), 134 U.S. 483 (1890)
United States v. Jones (1893), 147 U.S. 672 (1893)
United States v. Jones (1893), 149 U.S. 262 (1893)
United States v. Jones (1915), 236 U.S. 106 (1915)
United States v. Jones (1949), 336 U.S. 641 (1949)
United States v. Jones (1953), 345 U.S. 377 (1953)
United States v. Jones (2012), 565 U.S. 400 (2012), ruling that installing a GPS tracking device on a vehicle and using the device to monitor the vehicle's movements constitutes a search under the Fourth Amendment

See also
Jones v. United States (disambiguation)
 Lists of United States Supreme Court cases
 Lists of United States Supreme Court cases by volume

United States Supreme Court cases